Microcyba is a genus of African dwarf spiders that was first described by Å. Holm in 1962.

Species
 it contains eighteen species:
Microcyba aculeata Holm, 1964 – Congo
Microcyba affinis Holm, 1962 – Uganda
Microcyba angulata Holm, 1962 – Kenya, Uganda
Microcyba brevidentata Holm, 1962 – Tanzania
Microcyba calida Jocqué, 1983 – Gabon
Microcyba cameroonensis Bosmans, 1988 – Cameroon
Microcyba divisa Jocqué, 1983 – Gabon
Microcyba erecta Holm, 1962 – Uganda
Microcyba falcata Holm, 1962 (type) – Uganda
Microcyba hamata Holm, 1962 – Kenya, Uganda
Microcyba hedbergi Holm, 1962 – Uganda
Microcyba leleupi Holm, 1968 – Congo
Microcyba projecta Holm, 1962 – Uganda
Microcyba simulata Holm, 1962 – Kenya
Microcyba tridentata Holm, 1962 – Kenya, Uganda
Microcyba vancotthemi Bosmans, 1977 – Kenya
Microcyba viduata Holm, 1962 – Kenya
Microcyba vilhenai Miller, 1970 – Congo

See also
 List of Linyphiidae species (I–P)

References

Araneomorphae genera
Linyphiidae
Spiders of Africa